José Avelino Bettencourt ComC, OMRI (born 23 May 1962) is a Portuguese-Canadian prelate of the Catholic Church who has serves as Apostolic Nuncio to Armenia and Georgia since March 2018.

Biography
Born in Velas, Azores, on 23 May 1962, he settled at a young age in Canada with his family. Bettencourt was ordained a priest in 1993 in the Archdiocese of Ottawa and graduated with degrees in literature and theology from the University of Ottawa.

He entered the diplomatic service of the Holy See in 1999 and obtained a doctorate in canon law at Pontifical Gregorian University. He worked at the apostolic nunciature to the Democratic Republic of the Congo and then moved to the Secretariat of State of the Holy See.

On 14 November 2012, Pope Benedict XVI appointed him head of the protocol of the Secretariat of State. He was also responsible for contacts with the embassies accredited to the Holy See and to the central Vatican authority.

On 26 February 2018, Pope Francis gave him the title apostolic nuncio and appointed him Titular Archbishop of Aemona. He was named nuncio to Armenia on 1 March and to Georgia as well on 8 March. He received his episcopal ordination from Pope Francis on 19 March.

Honours and Arms

Honours

Coat of Arms 
Bettencourt was granted coat of arms by the Canadian Heraldic Authority through a Grant of Arms, on August 15, 2019.

See also
 List of heads of the diplomatic missions of the Holy See

References

1962 births
Living people
Portuguese Roman Catholic archbishops
Pontifical Ecclesiastical Academy alumni
Pontifical Gregorian University alumni
21st-century Roman Catholic titular archbishops
University of Ottawa alumni
Apostolic Nuncios to Georgia (country)
Apostolic Nuncios to Armenia
Grand Officers of the Order of Merit of the Italian Republic
People from São Jorge Island
Diplomats of the Holy See
Canadian people of Portuguese descent